Georges Anderson Nderubumwe Rutaganda (November 27, 1958 – October 11, 2010) was the second vice-president of the Rwandan Hutu militia Interahamwe. Rutaganda played a crucial role in the Rwandan genocide of 1994. Prosecutor James Stewart stated that "Without Georges Rutaganda, the Rwandan genocide would not have functioned the way it did." He was on radio RTLM (Radio Télévision Libre des Mille Collines) in Kigali in 1994, encouraging Interahamwe Militia to exterminate all Tutsis. It was alleged that Rutaganda captured, raped, and tortured Tutsi women in Interahamwe hideouts in Kigali. Other accounts state that Rutaganda captured Tutsi prostitutes, believing them to be witches.

During this time, Rutaganda was reported to supply his militia with stolen supplies from the Rwandan military. Rutaganda was arrested on October 10, 1995, and transferred to Arusha, Tanzania, on May 26, 1996. He was sentenced to life imprisonment for genocide, crimes against humanity and murder.

He died from illness in Benin, where he was serving his sentence, on October 11, 2010.

In popular culture
Rutaganda was portrayed by Hakeem Kae-Kazim in the historical drama film Hotel Rwanda.

References

1958 births
2010 deaths
People convicted by the International Criminal Tribunal for Rwanda
Prisoners sentenced to life imprisonment by international courts and tribunals
Rwandan prisoners sentenced to life imprisonment
Rwandan people convicted of genocide
Rwandan people convicted of crimes against humanity
Rwandan people convicted of murder
Rwandan people imprisoned abroad
Prisoners who died in Beninese detention
Rwandan people who died in prison custody